Anthony Penaloza, better known by his stage name Gus Black, (formerly known as Gus) is an American director, singer-songwriter, and producer from Los Angeles.

He signed to Almo Sounds and released two albums on the label, 1996's Gus and 1999's Word of Mouth Parade.  The label disbanded in 2000. Since then, Black has released three albums, all of which were released internationally before seeing domestic distribution. His album "Autumn Days" was selected by iTunes as Top 10 "Best Indie Singer/Songwriter" releases of 2006. The 2008 release "Today Is Not The Day..." was critically acclaimed in Europe.

He produced a hit cover of the popular Blue Öyster Cult song "Don't Fear the Reaper" for the Scream soundtrack.  The same cover was also featured at the end of the 19th episode of season 2 of Smallville, and in the horror film The Howling: Reborn.  His cover of Black Sabbath's "Paranoid" appeared on the "Absinthe Makes the Heart Grow Fonder" episode of the TV show Californication.  His work has been featured in several other TV shows as well, including:  Alias, Brothers and Sisters, One Tree Hill, and Grey's Anatomy.

In 2003 Lisa Marie Presley released her debut album To Whom It May Concern which featured a track co-written by Gus called "The Road Between". Similarly in 2005 Lisa Marie released her second album Now What which featured "When You Go" also co-written by Gus. Both albums were released via Capitol Records. 

Gus is an accomplished commercial and video director.  In addition to directing videos for his own songs, he directed the documentary "Tremendous Dynamite: The Making of Hombre Lobo" for Eels as well as several music videos clips for the band. He has also directed videos for Goo Goo Dolls, The Used, NeedToBreathe, Echosmith, The Wild Feathers, and Filter.

In 2011 he completed work on his 6th full-length recording entitled "The Day I Realized...".

Discography
Gus (Almo Sounds, 1996)
Word of Mouth Parade (Almo Sounds, 1999)
Uncivilized Love (Wild Abandon Records UK, 2002/Immergent Records US, 2003)
Autumn Days (Olinda/India Records, Europe, 2005/Cheap Lullaby Records, US, 2006)
Today Is Not the Day to Fuck with... (Cheap Lullaby, 2008)
The Day I Realized... (India Records 2011)
"Live at Lido" ( India Records 2012)

External links
Official Website
[ Allmusic profile]
Review of Word of Mouth Parade by Pif magazine
Review of Word of Mouth Parade by University of New Brunswick
Review of Uncivilized Love by in Music We Trust

Musicians from Los Angeles
Singers from California
American male singers
Living people
Year of birth missing (living people)